William Nwankwo Alo is a native of Ekwetekwe-Umuezeoka in Ezza North Local Government Area of Ebonyi State. He was born on April 15, 1965. He attended Community Primary School, Ekwetekwe in Ezza North Local Government Area, Ebonyi State.  He passed out from the school in 1976 with First School Living Certificate (FSLC).

Background
In 1977, he proceeded to St. Aidan's Secondary School, Umuezeoka also in Ezza North Local Government Area.  He obtained his West African School Certificate (WASC) in June, 1982.

The quest for higher education took him to the then Anambra State College of Education Awka for a degree programme.  He later transferred to University of Nigeria, Nsuka where he obtained BA Hons. Government/Education in 1989.  In 1990 he did the mandatory National Youth Service Corps Scheme.  He was posted to Lagelu/Egbeda Local Government Area in Oyo State.  He completed his National Youth Service Corps Programme in 1991.

In December 1992, Alo was employed as an Admin Officer in Enugu State.  Following the creation of Ebonyi State on October 1, 1996, Alo, along with other Civil Servants, were moved to the newly created Ebonyi State.

In his service to Ebonyi State (as a civil servant), he served in various ministries, until he rose to the rank of Chief Administrative Officer.  He was later appointed a Permanent Secretary in December, 2007.  As a Permanent Secretary in Ebonyi State, he served in the office of the Head of Service Ebonyi State, Ministry of Commerce, Industry and Mineral Development, Ministry of Lands, Survey and Housing, and Ministry of Education.

In 2013, William transferred his service from the Ebonyi State Government to the Federal Government of Nigeria.  He transferred as a Director GL 17 and was posted to the Federal Ministry of Interior.

In November 2015, the President of the Federal Republic of Nigeria, Muhammadu Buhari appointed him a Federal Permanent Secretary.  He has served as a Permanent Secretary – Economic Affairs office, Office of the Secretary to the Government of the Federation, Permanent Secretary Ministry of Niger Delta Affairs, Permanent Secretary Special Duties Office, Office of the Secretary to the Government of the Federation and presently, Federal Ministry of Labour and Employment.

Academic qualifications
First School Living Certificate, 1976
West African School Certificate, 1982
Bachelor of Arts Hons, 1989
Post Graduate Diploma (Public Relations), 1994
ASCON Certificate, 1993
Master of Science (M.Sc.), 2012
Ph.D. (Peace & Conflict Resolution), In view (2016 – date)

Professional bodies
Member, Institute of Corporate Administration
Fellow Chartered Institute of Administration

Positions held
General Monitor, Community Primary School, Ekwetekwe, 1975 – 1976
Senior Sanitarian, St. Hidans Secondary School Zmuezeoka, 1981- 1982
Commissioner for Welfare (Students Union, Government) College of Education, Awka, 1986
Chairman Ezza West Local Government Area (Transitional), 2002 – 2003
Co-ordinator of Permanent Secretaries, Ebonyi State, 2007 – 2013
Permanent Secretary (State/Federal), 2007 to date

References

</ref>

Nigerian politicians
1965 births
Living people